Hans-Jürgen Dollheiser (29 September 1928 – 27 August 1995) is a German former field hockey player who competed in the 1952 Summer Olympics.

References

External links
 

1928 births
1995 deaths
German male field hockey players
Olympic field hockey players of Germany
Field hockey players at the 1952 Summer Olympics
20th-century German people